Anthurium bakeri is a species of flowering plant in the family Araceae, found from Chiapas in Mexico through Central America and on to northwestern South America. A semiepiphyte with strappy leaves and bright red flowers, it is occasionally sold as a houseplant.

References

bakeri
House plants
Flora of Chiapas
Flora of Central America
Flora of Ecuador
Flora of Colombia
Flora of Venezuela
Flora of Guyana
Plants described in 1876